Cordelia Schmid is computer vision researcher, currently Head of the THOTH project team at INRIA (French Institute for Research in Computer Science and Automation), Montbonnot, France.

Schmid obtained a degree in Computer Science from the University of Karlsruhe, and her doctorate from the Institut National Polytechnique de Grenoble, with a prizewinning thesis on "Local Greyvalue Invariants for Image Matching and Retrieval".

Schmid was named Fellow of the Institute of Electrical and Electronics Engineers (IEEE) in 2012 for contributions to large-scale image retrieval, classification and object detection. She was a co-winner of the Longuet-Higgins Prize in 2006, in 2014, and again in 2016. In 2017, she became a member of the Academy of Sciences Leopoldina.
 		 	
She won the 2020 Milner Award.

References 

Fellow Members of the IEEE
Members of the German Academy of Sciences Leopoldina
Living people
French computer scientists
French women computer scientists
Year of birth missing (living people)